Title 8 of the United States Code codifies statutes relating to aliens and nationality in the United States Code.

Chapters 1-11 
 : General Provisions (repealed or omitted)
 : Elective Franchise (transferred)
 : Civil Rights (transferred/repealed)
 : Freedmen (omitted)
 : Alien Ownership of Land (transferred/omitted)
 : Immigration (transferred/omitted/repealed)
 : Exclusion of Chinese (omitted/repealed)
 : The Cooly Trade (repealed)
 : Miscellaneous Provisions (repealed or transferred)
 : Alien Registration (repealed)
 : Nationality (repealed or transferred)

: Immigration and Nationality

Subchapter I: General Provisions 
 : Definitions
 : Diplomatic and semidiplomatic immunities
 : Powers and duties of the Secretary, the Under Secretary, and the Attorney General
 : Powers and duties of Secretary of State
 : Liaison with internal security officers; data exchange
 : Employment authorization for battered spouses of certain nonimmigrants
  is repealed.
 : Additional report

Subchapter II: Immigration

Part I: Selection System 
 : Worldwide level of immigration
  is repealed
 : Numerical limitations on individual foreign states
 : Allocation of immigrant visas
 : Procedure for granting immigrant status
 : Revocation of approval of petitions; effective date
 : Unused immigrant visas
 : Annual admission of refugees and admission of emergency situation refugees
 : Asylum
 : Adjustment of status of refugees
 : Special agricultural workers
  is repealed.

Part II: Admission Qualifications for Aliens; Travel Control of Citizens and Aliens 
 : Admission of immigrants into the United States
 : Inadmissible aliens
  is repealed.
 : Denial of visas to confiscators of American property
 : Denial of entry into United States of foreign nationals engaged in establishment or enforcement of forced abortion or sterilization policy
 : Denial of entry into United States of Chinese and other nationals engaged in coerced organ or bodily tissue transplantation
 : Admission of aliens on giving bond or undertaking; return upon permanent departure
 : Requirements for sponsor’s affidavit of support
 : Admission of nonimmigrants
 : Philippine Traders as nonimmigrants
 : Travel control of citizens and aliens
  is transferred.
 : Conditional permanent resident status for certain alien spouses and sons and daughters
 : Conditional permanent resident status for certain alien entrepreneurs, spouses, and children
 : Visa waiver program for certain visitors
 : Provision of assistance to non-program countries
 : Admission of temporary H–2A workers
 : Designation of foreign terrorist organizations

Part III: Issuance of Entry Documents 
 : Issuance of visas
  is repealed.
 : Application for visas
 : Reentry permit
 : Immediate relative and special immigrant visas
  is repealed.

Part IV: Inspection, Apprehension, Examination, Exclusion, and Removal 
 : Lists of alien and citizen passengers arriving and departing
 : Detention of aliens for physical and mental examination
 : Entry through or from foreign territory and adjacent islands
 : Designation of ports of entry for aliens arriving by aircraft
 : Inspection by immigration officers; expedited removal of inadmissible arriving aliens; referral for hearing
 : Preinspection at foreign airports
 : Apprehension and detention of aliens
 : Mandatory detention of suspected terrorists; habeas corpus; judicial review
 : Deportable aliens
 : Expedited removal of aliens convicted of committing aggravated felonies
 : Initiation of removal proceedings
 : Removal proceedings
 : Cancellation of removal; adjustment of status
 : Voluntary departure
 : Records of admission
 : Detention and removal of aliens ordered removed
 : Enhancing efforts to combat the trafficking of children

Part V: Adjustment and Change of Status 
  is transferred.
  is repealed.
 : Judicial review of orders of removal
  is transferred.
  is repealed.
 : Authorizing State and local law enforcement officials to arrest and detain certain illegal aliens
 : Penalties related to removal
  is repealed.
 : Temporary protected status
 : Collection of fees under temporary protected status program
 : Adjustment of status of nonimmigrant to that of person admitted for permanent residence
 : Adjustment of status of certain entrants before January 1, 1982, to that of person admitted for lawful residence
 : Adjustment of status of certain nonimmigrants to that of persons admitted for permanent residence
 : Rescission of adjustment of status; effect upon naturalized citizen
 : Adjustment of status of certain resident aliens to nonimmigrant status; exceptions
 : Change of nonimmigrant classification
 : Record of admission for permanent residence in the case of certain aliens who entered the United States prior to January 1, 1972
 : Removal of aliens falling into distress

Part VI: Special Provisions Relating to Alien Crewmen 
 : Alien crewmen
 : Conditional permits to land temporarily
 : Hospital treatment of alien crewmen afflicted with certain diseases
 : Control of alien crewmen
 : Employment on passenger vessels of aliens afflicted with certain disabilities
 : Discharge of alien crewmen; penalties
 : Alien crewmen brought into the United States with intent to evade immigration laws; penalties
 : Limitations on performance of longshore work by alien crewmen

Part VII: Registration of Aliens 
 : Alien seeking entry; contents
 : Registration of aliens
 : Registration of special groups
 : Forms for registration and fingerprinting
 : Notices of change of address
 : Penalties

Part VIII: General Penalty Provisions 
 : Prevention of unauthorized landing of aliens
 : Bringing in aliens subject to denial of admission on a health-related ground; persons liable; clearance papers; exceptions; "person" defined
 : Unlawful bringing of aliens into United States
 : Bringing in and harboring certain aliens
 : Unlawful employment of aliens
 : Unfair immigration-related employment practices
 : Penalties for document fraud
 : Civil penalties for failure to depart
 : Improper entry by alien
 : Reentry of removed aliens
 : Aiding or assisting certain aliens to enter
 : Importation of alien for immoral purpose
 : Jurisdiction of district courts
 : Collection of penalties and expenses

Part IX: Miscellaneous 
 : Nonimmigrant visa fees
 : Printing of reentry permits and blank forms of manifest and crew lists; sale to public
 : Travel expenses and expense of transporting remains of officers and employees dying outside of United States
 : Officers and employees; overtime services; extra compensation; length of working day
 : Extra compensation; payment
 : Immigration officials; service in foreign contiguous territory
 : Disposition of money received as extra compensation
 : Applicability to members of the Armed Forces
 : Disposal of privileges at immigrant stations; rentals; retail sale; disposition of receipts
 : Disposition of moneys collected under the provisions of this subchapter
 : Powers of immigration officers and employees
 : Local jurisdiction over immigrant stations
 : Application to American Indians born in Canada
 : Establishment of central file; information from other departments and agencies
 : Burden of proof upon alien
 : Right to counsel
 : Deposit of and interest on cash received to secure immigration bonds
 : Undercover investigation authority
  is repealed.
 : Triennial comprehensive report on immigration
 : Reimbursement of States for costs of incarcerating illegal aliens and certain Cuban nationals
 : Integrated entry and exit data system
 : Biometric entry and exit data system
 : Annual report on criminal aliens
 : Penalties for disclosure of information
 : Increase in INS detention facilities; report on detention space
 : Treatment of expenses subject to emergency medical services exception
 : Reimbursement of States and localities for emergency ambulance services
 : Reports
 : Program to collect information relating to nonimmigrant foreign students and other exchange program participants
 : Communication between government agencies and the Immigration and Naturalization Service
 : Information regarding female genital mutilation
  is repealed.
 : Domestic violence information and resources for immigrants and regulation of international marriage brokers
 : Protections for domestic workers and other nonimmigrants
 : Protections, remedies, and limitations on issuance for A–3 and G–5 visas
 : Data on nonimmigrant overstay rates
 : Collection of data on detained asylum seekers
 : Collection of data on other detained aliens
 : Technology standard to confirm identity
 : Maintenance of statistics by the Department of Homeland Security
 : Secretary of Labor report
 : Acceptance and administration of gifts for immigration integration grants program

Subchapter III: Nationality and Naturalization

Subchapter IV: Refugee and Assistance

Subchapter V: Alien Terrorist Removal Procedure

Chapters 13-15 
 : Immigration and Naturalization Service
 : Restricting Welfare and Public Benefits for Aliens
 : Enhanced Border Security and Visa Entry Reform

References

External links
U.S. Code Title 8, via United States Government Publishing Office
U.S. Code Title 8, via Cornell University

Title 08
08